The 1907 Knox Old Siwash football team represented the Knox College of Illinois during the 1907 college football season.

Schedule

References

Knox
Knox Prairie Fire football seasons
Knox football